Yannick Mamilonne (born 9 February 1992) is a Guadeloupean professional footballer who plays as a forward.

References

1992 births
Living people
Association football forwards
French footballers
Guadeloupean footballers
Amiens SC players
US Quevilly-Rouen Métropole players
Paris FC players
FC Chambly Oise players
Ligue 2 players
Championnat National 2 players
Championnat National 3 players